The Coats School is a historic one-room schoolhouse in rural Benton County, Arkansas.  It is located near the end of Coats Road (County Road 391), near Spavinaw Creek, south of Maysville.   It is built of ashlar cut stone, with rusticated stone at the corners.  It has a gable roof of tin, with a central chimney.  Built c. 1905, it is a rare example of high-quality stone work in a vernacular building of modest proportions.

The building was listed on the National Register of Historic Places in 1988.

See also
National Register of Historic Places listings in Benton County, Arkansas

References

School buildings on the National Register of Historic Places in Arkansas
One-room schoolhouses in Arkansas
School buildings completed in 1905
National Register of Historic Places in Benton County, Arkansas
1905 establishments in Arkansas
Schools in Benton County, Arkansas